Major General Carl C:son von Horn (15 July 1903 – 13 March 1989) was a Swedish Army officer known for his service in various UN missions. He was the chief of United Nations Truce Supervision Organization in Palestine, the Supreme Commander of the United Nations Operation in the Congo during the Congo Crisis, and commander of United Nations Yemen Observation Mission in Yemen.

Career
von Horn was born on 15 July 1903 in Vittskövle, Sweden, the son of cavalry captain Carl von Horn and his wife Martha (née Stjernswärd). The younger brother, Jan von Horn, also chose a military career and eventually became a colonel and military attaché in London and The Hague. von Horn became an officer in the Life Guards of Horse (K 1) in 1923. He was promoted to captain of the General Staff in 1935 and served in the Swedish Army Service Troops in 1939. von Horn was promoted to major of the General Staff and the Defence Staff in 1942 and was chief of bureau at the Royal Railway Board's military bureau.

During World War II he helped organizing prisoner exchange between the Germans and the Allies, but also had to work with the Swedish extradition of Baltic soldiers. As a military man with a strong Anglo-Saxon ethos he called this "the most humiliating moment in modern Swedish history." von Horn was promoted to lieutenant colonel in 1945 when he also became chief of the Defence Staff's Communication Department. In 1947, von Horn was appointed military attaché in Oslo, and the following year he moved to Copenhagen where he had received a similar appointment. In 1949 he returned to Sweden and took a position at the Northern Småland Regiment (I 12) and the following year he was promoted to colonel and commander of Kronoberg Regiment (I 11) in Växjö. He stayed there for seven years; in 1957, he was appointed commander of Malmö Defence District (Fo 11).

UN career
In early 1958, von Horn was appointed chief of United Nations Truce Supervision Organization in Palestine by Dag Hammarskjöld, and was then promoted to major general. At first he allowed himself "to be optimistic" and he wrote in his memoirs that "instead of fully armed troops, tanks and artillery or even the threat of sanctions, Dag's moral support and my own determination was everything I had." In 1960 he became with short notice the Supreme Commander of the UN Force in the Congo during the beginning of what was to develop into the Congo Crisis, a mission, however, he was dismissed from six months later. von Horn then returned to work for the UN in Palestine. In 1963 he was sent to lead the UN observatory group United Nations Yemen Observation Mission in Yemen where fighting continued between government troops and rebels.

von Horn has been described as an arrogant leader, and also during the mission in Yemen, he quarreled with his superiors. von Horn suddenly resigned in protest and accused the UN not to provide enough resources for the mission, accusations that the Secretary-General U Thant described as "irresponsible and reckless". von Horn had refused to abide by the UN organization's demands for policy adjustments and opposed when politicians wanted to aggravate the situation in the field.

Personal life
von Horn was married three times. In the first marriage 1925–1944 he was married to baroness Maud von Otter (1904–1974), the daughter of major, baron Carl-Gustaf von Otter and Elisabeth (née Krook). He married a second time in 1945 to Britt (Bibi) Englund (1919–1962), the daughter of the wholesaler Ernst Englund and Ebba (née Wistrand). He married a third time in 1964 to Elisabeth Liljeroth (born 1932). von Horn died in 1989 and was buried in Källstorp cemetery in Trelleborg Municipality.

Dates of rank
1935 – Captain
1942 – Major
1945 – Lieutenant colonel
1950 – Colonel
1963 – Major general

Awards and decorations

Swedish
   Commander 1st Class of the Order of the Sword (6 June 1958)
   Knight of the Order of the Polar Star
   Knight of the Order of Vasa
   Swedish Central Federation for Voluntary Military Training Medal of Merit in silver
  Gold Medal of the Kronoberg Association for Volunteer Military Training (Kronobergs befäls (utbildnings) förbunds guldmedalj)
  Gold Medal of the Kronoberg Shooting Federation (Kronobergs skytteförbunds guldmedalj)
  Swedish Red Cross's silver medal

Foreign
   Commander of the Order of St. Olav (1 July 1949)
   Officer of the Order of the British Empire
   Knight of the Order of Leopold II
   Order of the Cross of Liberty, 4th Class with swords
   King Christian X's Liberty Medal
   King Haakon VII Freedom Cross
   United Nations Emergency Force Medal

Bibliography

Footnotes

References

External links
 

1903 births
1989 deaths
Swedish Army major generals
United Nations military personnel
People from Kristianstad Municipality
Commanders First Class of the Order of the Sword
Knights of the Order of the Polar Star
Recipients of the Order of Vasa
People of the Congo Crisis
Swedish military attachés
Swedish officials of the United Nations